Stanislav Zhekov (born 6 February 1980) is a Bulgarian footballer who plays as a defender for Nesebar. He is also assistant manager. In season 2019-2020 he is Head coach of Nesebar U19 team and they became champions in their championship.

Career
Zhekov previously played for Neftochimic Burgas, Spartak Varna, Chernomorets Burgas and Pomorie.

In June 2017, Zhekov returned to his hometown club Neftochimic as player and assistant manager.

References

1980 births
Living people
Sportspeople from Burgas
Bulgarian footballers
First Professional Football League (Bulgaria) players
Second Professional Football League (Bulgaria) players
Neftochimic Burgas players
PFC Spartak Varna players
PFC Chernomorets Burgas players
Expatriate footballers in Indonesia
FC Montana players
PFC Ludogorets Razgrad players
PFC Nesebar players
FC Pomorie players
Pelita Bandung Raya players
Liga 1 (Indonesia) players
Association football defenders
Bulgarian expatriates in Indonesia